Wykowo may refer to the following places:
Wykowo, Masovian Voivodeship (east-central Poland)
Wykowo, Grajewo County in Podlaskie Voivodeship (north-east Poland)
Wykowo, Kolno County in Podlaskie Voivodeship (north-east Poland)